Cheiracanthium pennatum is a spider species found in Europe.

See also 
 List of Eutichuridae species

References 

pennatum
Spiders described in 1878
Spiders of Europe